Eslamabad-e Yek may refer to:
 Eslamabad-e Yek, Chaharmahal and Bakhtiari
 Eslamabad-e Yek, Kerman